Robert Charles Todd (11 September 1949 – 31 March 2022) was an English professional footballer who played as a left winger in the Football League.

References

1949 births
2022 deaths
People from Goole
English footballers
Association football midfielders
National League (English football) players
English Football League players
Liverpool F.C. players
Rotherham United F.C. players
Mansfield Town F.C. players
Workington A.F.C. players
Hartlepool United F.C. players
Wigan Athletic F.C. players
Altrincham F.C. players
Scarborough F.C. players